Žarometi is a novel by Slovenian author Gitica Jakopin. It was first published in 1962.

See also
List of Slovenian novels

Slovenian novels
1962 novels